Banū Tamīm is an Arab tribe that originated in Najd in the Arabian Peninsula. It is mainly present in Saudi Arabia, Qatar, Kuwait, Iraq, Jordan, a strong presence in Algeria, and Morocco, Palestine, Tunisia, and Libya. It is also present in many other parts of the Arab world such as Egypt and Khuzestan in Iran. The word Tamim in Arabic means strong and solid. It can also mean those who strive for perfection.

History and origin
The traditional family tree of Banu Tamim is as follows: Tamim bin Murr bin 'Id bin Amr bin Ilyas bin Mudar bin Nizar bin Ma'ad bin Adnan - a distant descendant of Isma'il bin Ibrahim (Ishmael, son of Abraham).

Banu Tamim is one of the largest tribes of Arabia. The tribe occupied numerous Wadis and villages in central and eastern Arabia in the 6th century before playing an important role with the revelation of Islam. They came into contact with Muhammad in the 8th year of Hijrah, but they did not immediately convert to Islam. There are hadiths which praise virtually all of the major Arab tribal groups, and to indicate the extent of this praise, a few examples are listed here:

In Nahj al-Balagha, Letter 18, Imam Ali ibn Abi Talib says:
"Remember that Bani Tamim is such a clan that their star has not set as yet, amongst them if one great man dies there is another to take his place. Remember that after embracing Islam and even during pre-Islamic days these people were never regarded as mean, jealous or covetous. On the contrary, they had a very high status. Besides they have claims of kinship and friendship with us. If we behave kindly, patiently and sympathetically towards them Allah will reward us. But if we ill treat them we shall be sinning."

Lineage and branches 
Banu Tamim is an Adnanite tribe, descended from Adnan.
 
In the genealogical tradition of the tribe, it is argued that there is a direct line that can be drawn from Ibrahim to Tamim:
 Ibrahim
 Ishmael
 Adnan
 Ma'ad
 Nizar
 Mudar
 Ilyas
 Amr (Tabikhah)
 'Ud
 Murr
 Tamim
 
The tribe is mainly divided into four main branches, namely:
 Amr
 Banu Hanzala
 Banu Sa'd
 Al-Rabbab
 
The tribe was mainly concentrated in the central and northern parts of Najd before the spread of Islam, but had spread across the Arabian Peninsula after the Islamic conquest of the region, then had spread to areas ruled by subsequent caliphates. Banu Tamim is a branch of Banu Mudar.
 
The tribe extends west to Morocco and east to Khuzestan. After the Islamic conquests, the tribe migrated to modern-day Tunisia, Iraq, Morocco, the Khuzestan and Khorasan regions of Iran, and other parts of the Arab world. Banu Tamim held significant power for centuries in these areas, in the form of the Aghlabids and other minor dynasties.

Dynasties
 Aghlabids – ruling dynasty of Ifriqiya (modern-day Tunisia, Algeria, and Libya) from 800 to 909 which also controlled parts of southern Italy and Sicily.
Al Thani – ruling dynasty of Qatar since 1847.
Al ash-Sheikh – family of the Grand Muftis of the Emirate of Diriyah, then the Emirate of Najd and now modern-day Saudi Arabia for religious matters.
 Al Khater – family of the Middle East based primarily in Qatar, Saudi Arabia, and Bahrain.
Al Majali – family based in Al-Karak in modern-day Jordan since the 1770s.
 Al Mu'ammar – ruling dynasty of Najd based in Al-'Uyaynah from the seventeenth to the eighteenth century, their lineage goes back to the Anaqir of Banu Tamim.

Notable people
Among the tribe's members are:
 Muhammad ibn Abd al-Wahhab.
 Muhammad Ibn al 'Uthaymīn (d. 2001 C.E.) – Saudi Salafi preacher
 Khabbab ibn al-Aratt – a companion of Muhammad
 Ahnaf ibn Qais, companion of Umar ibn al-Khattab
 Abu Abdullah Muhammad bin Sa'id al-Tamimi – physician in Palestine during the 10th century CE
 Abu Al Fazal Abdul Wahid Yemeni Tamimi – Muslim saint Of the Junaidia order
 Abd-Allah ibn Ibadh al-Tamimi – Founder of the Ibadi sect
 Al-Farazdaq - Umayyad Classical poet
 Al-Hurr ibn Yazid al Tamimi - A general of the Umayyads who defected to Husayn ibn Ali
 Al-Qa'qa'a ibn Amr at-Tamimi – A general who commanded an army from his tribe and helped conquer Persia under Caliph Umar
 Abu Mansur al-Baghdadi – Shafi'i scholar and mathematician from Baghdad
 Musa ibn Ka'b al-Tamimi Provincial Abbasid Governor in mid 8th century.
 Muhammed ibn Umail al-Tamimi – tenth century alchemist from Al-Andalus
 Ibn Ishaq al-Tamimi al-Tunisi – 13th century Tunisian astronomer and the author of an important zij
 Abdul-Rahman al-Sa'di
 Khazim ibn Khuzayma al-Tamimi - Khurasani Arab military leader, Abbasid Revolutionary
 Ubayd Allah al-Anbari
 Ibrahim I ibn al-Aghlab – Founder of the Aghlabids' vassal, the emirs of Ifriqiya and Sicily from 800 to 909.
Abdallah ibn Ibrahim, the Emir of Ifriqiya from 812 to his death on 25 June 817.
 Jarīr – classical Arab poet
 Jassim bin Mohammed Al Thani – founder of the State of Qatar.
 Munzir ibn Sawa Al Tamimi – ruler of eastern parts of archaic Arabian peninsula who converted to Islam
 Sheikh Edebali - Sufi Master who served in the foundation of the Ottoman Empire and father-in-law of its founder Osman I
 Qatari ibn al-Fuja'a - Kharjite leader and poet who led an uprising against the Umayyads from Persia
 Munzir ibn Sawa Al-Tamimi
 Ishaq ibn Rahwayh
 Aktham ibn Sayfi
 Ubayd Allah al-Anbari

References

External links
 Royal Ancestry File
 The life of Mahomet by William Muir

 
Mudar
Arab groups
Tribes of Arabia
Tribes of Saudi Arabia
Demographics of Libya
Yemeni tribes
Tribes of Iraq
Tribes of Syria
Arab tribes in Morocco
Tribes of Jordan
Arab tribes in Algeria
Tribes of the State of Palestine